Harris Smith Hawthorne (February 29, 1832 – March 23, 1911) was a Union Army soldier in the American Civil War who received the U.S. military's highest decoration, the Medal of Honor.

He was awarded the Medal of Honor for extraordinary heroism shown on April 6, 1865, during the Battle of Sailor's Creek, where he captured Robert E. Lee's son, George Washington Custis Lee, while serving as a Corporal with Company F, 121st New York Volunteer Infantry. His Medal of Honor was awarded on December 29, 1894.

A competing claim for the capture of Lee was made in 1897 by David Dunnels White, a soldier of the 37th Massachusetts Infantry Volunteers. The claim was turned down by the U.S Army. In 2011, White's descendants submitted another claim which was also rejected. Their theory seems to be that Lee escaped after his initial detainment by White and was recaptured by Hawthorne.

Hawthorne died at the age of 79 on March 23, 1911 and was buried at Maple Grove Cemetery, Hoosick, NY.

Medal of Honor citation

See also
Battle of Sailor's Creek
George Washington Custis Lee
David Dunnels White

Notes

References

External links

 

1832 births
1911 deaths
United States Army Medal of Honor recipients
American Civil War recipients of the Medal of Honor
People from Salem, New York